Hamido's son (translit. Ibn Hamido) is a 1957 Egyptian comedy film directed by Fatin Abdel Wahab.

Cast
 Ismail Yassine as Hamido's son
 Hind Rostom as Aziza
 Ahmed Ramzy as Hassan
 Abd El Fatah El Quossary as Hanafi
 Zeinat Sedki as Hamida
 Tawfik El Deken as El Baz Afandi

See also
 Cinema of Egypt
 Lists of Egyptian films
 List of Egyptian films of the 1950s
 List of Egyptian films of 1953

References

External links
 
 Hamido's son on elcinema

1950s Arabic-language films
1957 films
1957 comedy films
Egyptian comedy films
Egyptian black-and-white films
Films directed by Fatin Abdel Wahab
Films shot in Egypt